Woodwark is a coastal locality in the Whitsunday Region, Queensland, Australia.

History 
The locality is named after Woodwark Bay, which was in turn named after George Smith Woodwark (mayor of King's Lynn) in 1886 by Lieutenant G.E. Richards of HMQS Paluma. It is believed that the name was suggested by Lieutenant Alexander Leeper of Paluma as his family lived in King's Lynn.

Geography
The waters of the Coral Sea form the northern boundary, part of the western, and most of the eastern.

References 

Whitsunday Region
Coastline of Queensland
Localities in Queensland